Kenneth James Yackel (March 5, 1930 – July 12, 1991) was an American ice hockey player. Yackel played for the American national team at the 1952 Winter Olympics. He briefly played professionally in the National Hockey League, appearing in six games with the Boston Bruins in 1959, the second American-developed player to appear in the NHL during the 1950s. He was briefly the head coach for Minnesota Gophers during the 1971–72 season, serving in an interim capacity after Glen Sonmor resigned mid-year. Yackel was inducted into the United States Hockey Hall of Fame in 1986.

Career statistics

Regular season and playoffs

International

Head coaching record

College

†Yackel replaced Glen Sonmor in December 1971

Awards and honors

References

External links
 

1930 births
1991 deaths
AHCA Division I men's ice hockey All-Americans
American men's ice hockey right wingers
Boston Bruins players
Cleveland Barons (1937–1973) players
Ice hockey coaches from Minnesota
Ice hockey players at the 1952 Winter Olympics
Ice hockey people from Saint Paul, Minnesota
Medalists at the 1952 Winter Olympics
Minneapolis Millers (IHL) players
Minnesota Golden Gophers men's ice hockey coaches
Minnesota Golden Gophers men's ice hockey players
Muskegon Zephyrs players
Olympic ice hockey players of the United States
Olympic medalists in ice hockey
Providence Reds players
Saskatoon Regals/St. Paul Saints players
Sportspeople from Saint Paul, Minnesota
United States Hockey Hall of Fame inductees